Asarum marmoratum is a species of wild ginger known by the common name marbled wild ginger.

It is native to the Klamath Mountains of northern California and southern Oregon, as well as adjacent slopes of the Cascade Range. It is a plant of moist high-elevation forests and rocky mountainsides. This is a rhizomatous perennial herb with hairy green leaves with bright cream-white colored marbling. The leaves are heart-shaped to kidney-shaped to nearly round. Flowers appear at ground-level. They consist of three coarsely hairy sepals which are dark greenish brown outside and dark reddish inside. The fruit is a fleshy capsule containing many seeds.

Asarum marmoratum is a state-listed endangered species in Oregon.

References

External links
Jepson Manual Treatment
Photo gallery

marmoratum
Flora of California
Flora of Oregon
Flora without expected TNC conservation status